Razmak Tehsil is a subdivision located in North Waziristan district, Khyber Pakhtunkhwa, Pakistan. The population is 17,629 according to the 2017 census.

Notable people
Mir Kalam

See also 
 Razmak
 List of tehsils of Khyber Pakhtunkhwa

References 

Tehsils of Khyber Pakhtunkhwa
Populated places in North Waziristan